Myles James Noble Straw (born October 17, 1994) is an American professional baseball outfielder for the Cleveland Guardians of Major League Baseball (MLB). He was drafted by the Houston Astros in the 12th round of the 2015 Major League Baseball draft, and made his major league debut with them in 2018.

Amateur career
Straw attended Braden River High School in Bradenton, Florida, and played college baseball at St. Johns River State College.

Professional career

Houston Astros

Straw was drafted by the Houston Astros in the 12th round of the 2015 Major League Baseball Draft. He was planning on transferring to the University of South Alabama, but instead signed with the Astros. 

Straw made his professional debut with the Greeneville Astros, with whom he batted .268 with 22 stolen bases in 58 games. He played in 2016 with the Quad Cities River Bandits and Lancaster JetHawks, slashing a combined .358/.423/.454 with one home run, 27 RBIs, and 21 stolen bases in 87 total games, and 2017 with the Buies Creek Astros and Corpus Christi Hooks where he hit a combined .290 with one home run, 44 RBIs, and 38 stolen bases in 127 games. Straw started 2018 with Corpus Christi and was promoted to the Fresno Grizzlies during the season.

Straw was promoted to the major leagues on September 15, 2018. He scored his first career run on September 21, 2018, off of a bunt by Jake Marisnick.  He was a pinch runner for J. D. Davis. The next day, Straw recorded his first career steal. On September 29, 2018, Straw hit his first Major League home run, against starting pitcher Yefry Ramírez of the Baltimore Orioles.

In 2019, Straw batted .269/.378/.343 with 27 runs, 7 RBIs, and 8 stolen bases while being caught once, in 108 at bats.

In 2020, Straw batted .207/.244/.256 with 8 runs, 8 RBIs, and 6 stolen bases while being caught twice, in 82 at bats. He played 27 games in center field, and one game at shortstop.

Cleveland Indians / Guardians
On July 30, 2021, Straw was traded to the Cleveland Indians in exchange for reliever Phil Maton and minor leaguer Yainer Díaz.  Straw finished the 2021 season batting .271/.349/.348 with 4 home runs, 48 RBIs and 30 stolen bases between the Astros and Indians.

On April 9, 2022, Straw signed a 5-year, $25 million extension with the Guardians. 

In 2022 he had the lowest slugging percentage and the lowest OPS (.564) in the majors, the lowest barrel percentage (0.7%), and the highest percentage of balls hit to the opposite field (36.1%). He batted .221/.291/.273 in 535 at bats, with zero home runs, 32 RBIs, and 21 stolen bases in 22 attempts. He was the only major league qualified batter to not hit any home runs in 2022.  On defense, he won a Gold Glove Award in center field.

References

External links

1994 births
Living people
People from Garden Grove, California
Baseball players from California
Major League Baseball outfielders
Houston Astros players
Cleveland Indians players
Cleveland Guardians players
Gold Glove Award winners
St. Johns River State Vikings baseball players
Greeneville Astros players
Quad Cities River Bandits players
Lancaster JetHawks players
Buies Creek Astros players
Corpus Christi Hooks players
Fresno Grizzlies players
Round Rock Express players